Zhang Wentai (born April 1940) is a general (shangjiang) of the People's Liberation Army (PLA). He was a member of the 16th Central Committee of the Chinese Communist Party.

Biography
Zhang was born in Jiaozhou County (now Jiaozhou City), Shandong, in April 1940.

He enlisted in the People's Liberation Army (PLA) in December 1958, and joined the Chinese Communist Party (CCP) in September 1960. He served in Changbaishan Fortress Area between 1958 and 1975. In February 1975, he was assigned to Jinan Military Region, where he moved up the ranks to become deputy political commissioner in December 1993 and political commissioner in September 1999. He became political commissioner of the People's Liberation Army General Logistics Department in October 2002, and served until June 2005. In December 2005, he was made vice chairperson of the National People's Congress Environment Protection and Resources Conservation Committee, a position he held until March 2013.

He was promoted to the rank of major general (shaojiang) in September 1988, lieutenant general (zhongjiang) in July 1995 and general (shangjiang) in June 2004.

Personal life 
His son-in-law, political commissar of the 42nd Group Army and deputy political commissar of the Southern Theater Command Ground Force, suicided by taking sleeping pills in August 2016.

Publication

References

1940 births
Living people
People from Jiaozhou City
Central Party School of the Chinese Communist Party alumni
People's Liberation Army generals from Shandong
People's Republic of China politicians from Shandong
Chinese Communist Party politicians from Shandong
Members of the 16th Central Committee of the Chinese Communist Party